Hans Christoph Fritzsche (before 1629 – 1674 in Hamburg) was a German organ builder from Dresden who worked in northern Germany, Denmark and southern Sweden.

Life 
Fritzsche was the son of the organ builder Gottfried Fritzsche from his first marriage. In 1655, he established his workshop in Copenhagen. There were family ties to Friederich Stellwagen, as he married Fritzsche's sister Theodora. His son-in-law Hans Heinrich Cahman married his daughter Anna Christina and continued the business after Fritzsche died during work on the new building in Hamburg-Neuenfelde.

Proven works

References

Further reading 
 
 
 

 

German pipe organ builders
Date of birth unknown
Place of birth unknown
1674 deaths